Canaries Sometimes Sing is a comedy play by the British writer Frederick Lonsdale that was first staged in 1929 at the Globe Theatre in the West End. It represented the breakthrough role as a solo performer of the French comedienne Yvonne Arnaud.

Film adaptation
In 1931 it was adapted into the British film Canaries Sometimes Sing directed by and starring Tom Walls along with Yvonne Arnaud and Cathleen Nesbitt.

References

Bibliography
 Chambers, Colin. Continuum Companion to Twentieth Century Theatre. A&C Black, 2006.
 Donaldson, Frances. Freddy Lonsdale. Bloomsbury Publishing,  2011.
 Nicoll, Alardyce. English Drama, 1900-1930: The Beginnings of the Modern Period. Part I. Cambridge University Press, 1973.

Plays by Frederick Lonsdale
1929 plays
British plays adapted into films
West End plays